Frank Joseph Hayden,  is a retired physical education/kinesiology professor and pioneer of the Special Olympics from Oakville, Ontario.

Personal life 
Hayden was born in Windsor, Ontario and lives in Burlington. He completed his Bachelor of Arts (BA) at the University of Western Ontario in 1955, and a Master of Science (MS) in 1958 and Doctor of Philosophy (PhD) in 1962 at the University of Illinois at Urbana–Champaign. Hayden joined the faculty of the University of Western Ontario in 1964, then became director of the School of Physical Education and Athletics at McMaster University in 1975. He retired from McMaster in 1988.

Special Olympics 
While at Western in the early 1960s, Hayden researched fitness programs for disabled children. He has a notable interest in sports and fitness activities for children, especially for those who have mental disabilities. His research became known to the Joseph P. Kennedy Jr. Foundation, and for two years Hayden helped produce and build a fitness program and establish legislation to accommodate persons with disabilities. In 1968, he organized the first Chicago Special Olympics with the Kennedy Foundation and the Chicago Park District, and legally incorporated "Special Olympics Inc". Today this program supplies training and friendly rivalry for more than three million athletes with disabilities in over 170 countries. Hayden served as executive director of the Special Olympics from 1968 to 1972, founded and lead the Office of European Affairs for Special Olympics International in Paris from 1988 to 1990, and was a special consultant to the Canadian Special Olympics from 1994 to 2000.

Honours 
Hayden was made an officer of the Order of Canada in 2000 and a member of the Order of Ontario in 2012 A plaque in his honour was unveiled outside his former laboratory in Thames Hall at Western University in April 2012. He has also received the Queen Elizabeth II Golden Jubilee Medal and the Queen Elizabeth II Diamond Jubilee Medal. Dr. Frank J. Hayden Secondary School in Burlington, Ontario was named in his honour in 2013. In 2016 he was inducted into Canada's Sports Hall of Fame.

Hayden has received honorary degrees from McMaster University (1997), the University of Calgary (1988), the University of Toronto (1999), Saint Mary's University, Halifax (2004), the University of Western Ontario (2011), and Memorial University of Newfoundland (2017).

References

External links 

 In Conversation with Dr. Frank Hayden, June 2016, at The Canadian Encyclopedia
  

Living people
Academic staff of McMaster University
Members of the Order of Ontario
Companions of the Order of Canada
People from Windsor, Ontario
Year of birth missing (living people)
People from Oakville, Ontario